The village Chondi or Chaundi, the
birthplace of Punyashlok Rajmata Ahilyadevi Holkar, is in Jamkhed taluka of district Ahmednagar. The state government of Maharashtra has decided to develop Chondi as a national memorial.

It is on the Ahmednagar-Beed State Highway, 78 kilometres from Ahmednagar.

References

Villages in Ahmednagar district